Image Bukhan (Nepal Bhasa:ईमेज बुखँ) is the first news program in Nepal Bhasa. This program is broadcast two times every day.

Etymology
The word Image Bukhan comes from two words Image and Bukhan. Image is the name of the television station and "Bukhan" means news in Nepal Bhasa.

News readers
Sulindra Shakya
S Bajracharya

See also
Nepal Bhasa
Nepal Bhasa movement

Newar-language mass media